Fulvio Dapit (born 13 September 1975) is an Italian male sky runner, who won four races of the Skyrunner World Series.

World Cup wins

National titles
Italian Skyrunning Championships 
Overall: 2007
Sky Ultra: 2015

See also
 Skyrunner World Series - Multiple winners

References

External links
 Fulvio Dapit profile at Association of Road Racing Statisticians

1975 births
Living people
Italian sky runners
Italian male mountain runners
21st-century Italian people